The Estevan Group, formerly the Estevan Islands, is a small archipelago in the Hecate Strait region of the North Coast of British Columbia, Canada.  The archipelago is located on the west side of Campania Island, which is separated from the group by Estevan Sound and is itself to the west of Gil Island across Squally Channel.  Southeast of it and of the Estevan Group is Caamaño Sound, beyond which is Aristazabal Island; to the east of all is Princess Royal Island, the second largest on the British Columbia Coast.  To the northwest of the group is Banks Island.
The five largest islands of the group are named after Lieutenant-Governors of British Columbia - Trutch, Barnard, Dewdney, Prior and Lotbinière.  Another island, Tennant Island, is located in Langley Passage, which runs through the heart of the archipelago on the southwest flank of Trutch Island, and is  the site of a provincial nature conservancy and is adjacent to an aerodrome at Ethelda Bay on Barnard Island.

References

North Coast of British Columbia
Islands of British Columbia
Tsimshian